Megan Hauserman (born November 5, 1981) is an American model and reality television personality, best known for her repeated appearances on VH1 including second season of Rock of Love with Bret Michaels, the first season of I Love Money, and Rock of Love: Charm School. After becoming a fan favorite she was offered her own dating game show: Megan Wants a Millionaire.

Early life
Megan Hauserman was born November 5, 1981. She is from Chicago, Illinois.

Modeling career
In the early 2000s Megan began her modeling career as a holiday show model on the Jerry Springer show while attending college at the University of Illinois at Chicago. She has also worked as a fitness model for Benchwarmer Trading Cards from 2005 to 2010.

Hauserman was featured in a photoshoot for Guitar World magazine's Holiday 2009 Review Guide, along with fellow reality television contestants Brandi "Hambone" Cunningham, Destiney Sue Moore, and Kristy Joe Muller. Megan Hauserman was also featured on the cover and inside of the magazine of the 2010 Guitar World Buyer's Guide with Daisy of Love's Daisy de la Hoya. The magazine was on sale July 14, 2009.

In 2013, Megan was the feature model for the Boca Raton-based jewelry company "Cerca Trova Fashion" and led the campaign.

Reality television

Beauty and the Geek
Hauserman was a winning contestant on the third season of Beauty and the Geek along with her partner Alan "Scooter" Zackheim. She appeared on all nine episodes of the third season, winning the competition.

In February 2007, Hauserman revealed that she would spend her half of the money: "I’m going to go to Disneyland and go on vacation, and get my hair done." However, during a phone interview in September 2008, Hauserman was asked what she had done with the Beauty and the Geek money and she said she put all of it, $125,000, towards her mortgage.

Rock of Love with Bret Michaels
Hauserman was also a contestant on the second season of VH1's Rock of Love with Bret Michaels. Megan said that she discovered the show from an advertisement on Craigslist: "I had just seen an ad on Craigslist and I went to an open call in Chicago at a restaurant in which the casting people were traveling all over the country and accepting videos from all over the world. And they picked me out of thousands of applicants." She appeared on eleven of the fourteen episodes in the second season. Megan was eliminated in the ninth episode because Michaels never felt a real "connection" with her, leaving her in fifth place.

In an interview with The Jacksonville Observer she stated, "I really was heartbroken over him (Bret Michaels) for a long time. I went on there and I did fall in love with him, but we remain friends."

I Love Money
Hauserman was a contestant on the first season of VH1's I Love Money, a reality show where 17 former contestants from Rock of Love, Flavor of Love, and I Love New York compete for a $250,000 cash prize. Megan appeared on all fourteen episodes of the first season and is featured at the center of the season one poster. On the first episode when she was asked what she would do with the money if she won the competition, she stated that she wants to help "mentally challenged" dogs, and that she adopted a mentally challenged dog, a chihuahua named Lily. She quit the competition in the thirteenth episode (the finale) when it was revealed that she would have to face a jury of former contestants whom she had a part in eliminating. She finished the competition in third place. Hauserman stated in her exit interview that she was happy with her decision to quit not only because it stopped her contestants from getting the satisfaction of payback, but also that she was happy that she stopped everyone she didn't want to win the money and that she was satisfied with whoever won the money in the top three. Hauserman also stated that she never thought that she would win the money, and that she came simply to have fun and play the game to the best of her ability. On the I Love Money reunion special, Megan said that there were no rules opposing the way she played the game, so she used her brain to out-smart people, because it was her given talent.

Rock of Love: Charm School
Hauserman was a contestant in VH1's Rock of Love: Charm School, a reality show where 14 former Rock of Love contestants must learn to abandon their improper old ways and develop proper etiquette in order to compete for $100,000 and the title, Charm School Queen. The show premiered October 12, 2008 and is hosted by Sharon Osbourne. She appeared on seven of the twelve episodes, despite getting expelled in the fourth episode for kicking classmate, and later winner, Brandi Mahon. Megan finished in tenth place.

Hauserman has filed a lawsuit against Sharon Osbourne, claiming battery, negligence and infliction of emotional distress, over an incident occurring during the taping of the twelfth episode, the reunion special, after Hauserman made derogatory comments about Sharon and Ozzy Osbourne, prompting Sharon to pull out Megan's hair. On February 13, 2011, the case was settled out of court with the details kept non disclose.

Megan Wants a Millionaire
Hauserman's own VH1 reality dating show, titled Megan Wants a Millionaire, premiered August 2, 2009 on VH1. Hauserman stated in the interview that she was looking for "a mature guy that can handle me and doesn't cry" and states "He doesn't have to be rich; he has to be stable." Hauserman said she is taking the show seriously, it will be "very real". Hauserman's best friends, Brandi Cunningham (who appeared with Hauserman on I Love Money and Rock of Love: Charm School) and Cecille Gahr (who lost to Megan in the finale of Beauty and the Geek 3) appeared on Megan Wants a Millionaire to support her and help her with her decisions.

On August 24, 2009, VH1 announced that the show had been cancelled after airing just three episodes, because contestant Ryan Jenkins was a suspect in the murder of Jasmine Fiore. Hauserman has been interviewed on the subject by AOL and TMZ. She stated that the Jenkins-Fiore situation was "a very challenging time, I'm happy to move forward at this point. It's been a very upsetting, sad, tragic situation that nobody could have expected."

Television appearances

The Great Debate
Hauserman appeared on the VH1 program, The Great Debate that aired from July 6 to July 10, 2009. The main premise of the show is the debates and comparisons from current and past pop culture subjects. Hauserman appeared on five episodes as a commentator for the show, giving her opinions about many of the debated subjects.

Sexiest Women of Reality TV
Hauserman appeared on a television program entitled Sexiest Women of Reality TV Swimsuit Calendar Edition. The program was released on DirecTV on September 1, 2009. Cecille Gahr and Angelique Morgan (who appeared alongside Hauserman on Rock of Love 2 and Rock of Love: Charm School) are also on the program. In November 2009, Hauserman will appear on another DirecTV program called, Sexiest Women of Reality TV: Bikini Babes, where she again will appear alongside Gahr.

TV's BadAss
Hauserman appeared on the TV Series BadAss in 2011. The episode featured four models swimming with sharks in the Bahamas.

True Crime with Aphrodite Jones
Hauserman appeared on the series True Crime with Aphrodite Jones on Investigation Discovery in May, 2011. This was her first on air interview about the Ryan Jenkins murder/suicide. The episode reenacted the events leading up to the murder of Jasmine Fiore, the suicide of Ryan Jenkins, and the cancellation of Megan Wants a Millionaire.

Truth.com Commercial
Hauserman starred in a Truth.com commercial alongside her dog Lily in 2009 to promote the anti-smoking campaign.

The E! True Hollywood Story: Life After Reality TV
Hauserman was interviewed while pregnant and one month after the birth of her son at her home in Boca Raton, Florida. She discussed a variety of events occurring during her long reality TV career and her life now as a mother.

American Greed
In January 2015, Megan appeared in an episode of CNBC's American Greed. The story was of Tim Durham titled "The Playboy of Indiana". Hauserman recounted a party she attended hosted by Durham in 2007.

For Real: The True Story of Reality TV with Andy Cohen
In 2021, Megan was featured on Andy Cohen's documentary series airing on E!. The documentary told the true story of the evolution of reality TV from its start to current day productions. Megan's show Megan Wants a Millionaire was featured as being one of the most highly anticipated and talked about shows on VH1 in the 2000s, sealing its role in reality TV history.

Other work
Hauserman has become the focus of a competition, "Megan and the Prime Girls". Megan is currently the spokesperson for the company hosting the competition, NY Strip Steakhouse and Cabarnet, located in Pompano Beach, Florida. The premise of the competition is to find "Megan's Primegirl" to join Hauserman as the spokesperson for their company. The competition took place April 15, 2010, thru June 24, 2010.

Personal life
Hauserman is a 2005 graduate of the University of Illinois at Chicago where she earned a degree in accounting. Hauserman has worked with many charities, including Susan G. Komen for the Cure and she also works with animal rescue charities.

During an interview with MSN TV News, when asked what she was going to do with her life after Megan Wants a Millionaire, she stated, "Married life...I want to have my little babies and I want to become an expert tennis player. I want to devote my life to tennis and to children." After the cancellation of Megan Wants a Millionaire, however, Hauserman stated in an interview with People that she wants to continue her television show appearances, stating: "I really enjoy being on TV and I love my fans," she says. "I want to continue doing TV work."

On April 8, 2014, Hauserman and her pet chihuahua Lily won a trophy in the Lighthouse Point Dog Show for the category "Smallest Dog".

On September 4, 2014, Hauserman gave birth to her son at West Boca Medical Center in Boca Raton, Florida. The announcement was made on Hauserman's E! True Hollywood Story airing late in 2014. Hauserman's husband and father of her son is professional golfer and Fuel U Fast Inc. owner Derren Edward.

Megan is currently living in Boca Raton, Florida.

Filmography

Awards

References

External links

 Photos VH1's Megan Hauserman
 A History of Megan @ VH1.com
 

Female models from Florida
Living people
Participants in American reality television series
People from Boca Raton, Florida
Reality show winners
University of Illinois Chicago alumni
1981 births